Local and/or General is a radio show on Triple R radio in Melbourne, Australia. It was created and hosted by Natalie Mitchell and Richard Moffat in 1997 and focuses on new Australian music. Many Australian bands had their first airplay on this program due to a policy of playing quality demo tapes and CDs before an act was signed.

The name Local and/or General was borrowed from the name of a song and album by early 1980s band Models.

In 1998 Richard Moffat left the show, and Natalie Mitchell hosted solo until 1999 when regular fill host Ryan Egan joined the show as co-host. Mitchell left the show in 2001 and Egan continued hosting solo until 2007 and handed over the reins to Jacinta Parsons, who hosted for a few years before moving on Dynamite and Detour shows. The show was then hosted by Nicole Jones and Luke Pocock for the next two years, with Pocock leaving in early 2011 to host his own show 'Set it Out' on Tuesday drivetime and Jones hosting solo until April 2013.

External links
 Triple R program page

Australian radio programs
1990s Australian radio programs
2000s Australian radio programs
2010s Australian radio programs
2020s Australian radio programs